Fly Flying Ska was Prince Buster's second studio album. The album features many ska legends, including The Skatalites, Toots and the Maytals, Roland Alphonso, and Don Drummond among others.

Track listing
 "Flying Ska (Wings of a Dove)" - Prince Buster
 "Lucky 7" - Prince Buster
 "Perhaps" - Prince Buster featuring The Skatalites
 "My Queen" - Prince Buster featuring Bobby Gaynor and Errol Dunkley
 "I Go" - Prince Buster featuring Millie Small and Roy Panton
 "Roland Plays the Prince" - Prince Buster featuring Roland Alphonso
 "Call Me" - Prince Buster
 "Eye for an Eye" - Prince Buster
 "River Jordan" - Prince Buster featuring Owen Gray
 "The Greatest" - Prince Buster
 "Ska War" - Prince Buster featuring The Maytals
 "The Burial" - Prince Buster featuring Don Drummond

References

1964 albums
Prince Buster albums
Blue Beat Records albums